The 1974 Federal Territory of Kuala Lumpur Agreement was signed on 28 January 1974 by the fifth Yang di-Pertuan Agong, Tuanku Abdul Halim Muadzam Shah ibni Almarhum Sultan Badlishah on behalf of the Federal Government of Malaysia; and the Sultan of Selangor Almarhum Sultan Salahuddin Abdul Aziz Shah ibni Almarhum Sultan Sir Hishamuddin Alam Shah, on behalf of State Government of Selangor. This agreement was signed at Istana Negara, Kuala Lumpur signifies the official handling Kuala Lumpur territory over to the Federal Government, which resulted in the establishment of the Federal Territory.

There are four provisions made in this agreement, namely, the transfer of jurisdiction powers to the Federal Territory, encompassing the areas of the Federal Territory, concerns on return, financial calculation and Board of Advisors.

The proclamation of the Federal Territory of Kuala Lumpur, 1974
The Federal Territory of Kuala Lumpur was proclaimed on 1 February 1974 and signed by the second Malaysian prime minister, Tun Abdul Razak bin Hussein. This proclamation came about after the signing of the Federal Territory of Kuala Lumpur Agreement by the fifth Yang di-Pertuan Agong, Tuanku Abdul Halim Muadzam Shah ibni Almarhum Sultan Badlishah on 28 January 1974. The proclamation, which was effective on 1 February 1974, Kuala Lumpur and the areas gazetted under Plan Gazette No. 383 formed the Federal Territory.

See also
 Kota Darul Ehsan
 Labuan
 Putrajaya
 Federal Territory Day

References

1970s in Kuala Lumpur
History of Selangor
1974 in Malaysia
1974 in politics
Politics of Malaysia